Schapville is an unincorporated community located just east of The Galena Territory in Jo Daviess County, Illinois, United States.

References

Unincorporated communities in Illinois
Unincorporated communities in Jo Daviess County, Illinois